Livio José Bendaña Morales (born 22 October 1969) is a Nicaraguan retired footballer.

Club career
Nicknamed el Pollo (the Chicken), he made his professional debut for Diriangén on 8 March 1986 against Juventus Managua and scored his first goal against Real Estelí on 4 May that year. He also played for Hermanos Molina, Juventus, Real Estelí and Walter Ferretti. He scored 130 league goals in the 1990s to complete a career total of 148, scoring 4 goals in one match three times and making 6 hat-tricks.

International career
The moustached Bendaña made his debut for Nicaragua in an April 1991 UNCAF Nations Cup qualification match against El Salvador and has earned a total of 11 caps, scoring 1 goal. He has represented his country in 3 FIFA World Cup qualification matches and played at the 1993 and 1997 UNCAF Nations Cups.

International goals
Scores and results list Honduras' goal tally first.

Personal life
Bendaña is son of legendary Nicaraguan footballer of the 1950s, Livio Bendaña Espinoza. His own son, Livio Gabriel Bendaña Quintanilla, was at 12 years invited to train with Spanish giants Real Madrid.

References

1969 births
Living people
Association football forwards
Nicaraguan men's footballers
Nicaragua international footballers
Diriangén FC players
Real Estelí F.C. players
C.D. Walter Ferretti players
Place of birth missing (living people)